Lemonomycin is an antibiotic with the molecular formula C27H41N3O9 which is produced by the bacterium Streptomyces candidus. Lemonomycin was first isolated in 1964 Lemonomycin has also shown activity against human colon tumor cells.

References

Further reading 

 
 
 

Antibiotics
Heterocyclic compounds with 4 rings
Nitrogen heterocycles
Methoxy compounds
Tertiary amines
Tertiary alcohols
Geminal diols
Tetrahydropyrans